Jean de La Forêt, also Jean de La Forest or Jehan de la Forest (died 1537), was the first official French Ambassador to the Ottoman Empire, serving from 1534 to 1537. Antonio Rincon had preceded him as an envoy to the Ottoman Empire from 1530 to 1533. When Jean de La Forêt died in Constantinople in 1537, he was succeeded by Antonio Rincon as official Ambassador.

1534 embassy to the Ottoman Empire

Jean de La Forêt departed together with the returning Ottoman embassy to France. On his way to  Constantinople, Jean de La Forêt first landed in north Africa, where he offered Hayreddin Barbarossa fifty ships and supplies in exchange for help against Genoa. He also asked Hayreddin to raid the coasts of Spain "with all manner of war".

Jean de La Forêt arrived in the Ottoman capital in May 1534, accompanied by his cousin Charles de Marillac and the scholar Guillaume Postel, and endeavored to exert French influence on Ottoman affairs. He accompanied Suleiman to Azerbaijan in the Ottoman–Safavid War against Persia, until they finally returned together to Constantinople in early 1536.

Jean de La Forêt was directed to seek trading privileges, as well as religious arrangements and military agreements between France and the Ottoman Empire. De La Forêt had also been instructed by Francis I to obtain "a million of gold, which will be no inconvenience to the Grand Signior". In exchange, Francis I proposed in his instructions to La Forêt: an ambassador, a perpetual treaty of alliance, trade and a promise "to hold all Christianity quiet, without war undertaken against him... in a universal peace", by weakening Charles V "until he can no more resist".

Jean de la Foret also had secret military instructions to organize a combined offensive on Italy in 1535:

Through the negotiations of de La Forêt with the vizir Ibrahim Pasha it was agreed that combined military operations against Italy would take place, in which France would attack Lombardy while the Ottoman Empire would attack from Naples.

1536 Franco-Turkish treaty

In February 1536, de la Forêt obtained the signature of a commercial treaty called Capitulations (of which only a draft has been recovered), which was the foundation for French influence in the Ottoman Empire and the Levant until the 19th century. Suleiman seemingly had some doubts about French commitment, expressing: "How can I have trust in him? He has always promised more than he can carry out", referring to the lack of French commitment in 1534–35, when Tunis was finally recaptured by Charles V, but he nevertheless agreed to the alliance upon Francis I's invasion of Piedmont in early 1536.

The 1536 Franco-Turkish treaty allowed the French in the Ottoman Empire to be judged by their own laws, in a French Consular court (a status the Venetians had already been granted), exemption from the usual taxes and dues levied upon non-Muslim foreigners, and trading concessions. This treaty offered guaranties (especially extraterritoriality) that would become the model for future "unequal treaties" between European and Asian powers. By this agreement, French law courts, churches and valuables would all remain extraterritorial in the Ottoman Empire. In a sense, French possessions in the Ottoman Empire would become the first foreign possessions of the French Crown, effectively a Crown Colony of France. The French protectorate also extended to the Holy Places of Jerusalem. By 1620, one third of France's foreign trade was done with the Ottoman Empire.

The commercial treaty actually was something of a façade for Jean de La Forêt, whose main role was actually to coordinate military collaboration between France and the Ottoman Empire. The commercial treaty however would become prominent from the second half of the 16th century.

Once the treaty with the Turks was secured, Francis I invaded Savoy in 1536, starting the Italian War of 1536–1538. A Franco-Turkish fleet was stationed in Marseille by the end of 1536, threatening Genoa. In 1537 Hayreddin Barbarossa raided the Italian coast and laid siege to Corfu, although this provided only limited assistance to the French. With Charles V unsuccessful in battle and squeezed between the French invaders and the Ottomans, Francis I and Charles V ultimately made peace at the Truce of Nice, 18 June 1538. La Forêt died at Constantinople in the following year.  Charles V would turn his efforts against the Ottomans, only to lose the Battle of Preveza on 28 September 1538.

The vizier died soon after the treaty was made in 1536, and there is doubt whether the treaty was formally ratified at this point, since only an archived draft has been found. The treaty of alliance between France and the Ottoman Empire would eventually be ratified later in 1569 through ambassador Claude du Bourg. Suleiman nevertheless respected the content of the agreement, and launched his armies, awaiting for the French offensive.

Scientific mission
Jean de La Forêt was accompanied on his embassy by the French linguist and writer Guillaume Postel, who led the scientific research of the mission, and made an extremely positive account of the Ottoman civilization and its educational, judicial and welfare systems in his De Orbis terrae concordia libri quattuor.

See also
Franco-Ottoman alliance
France-Asia relations

References

Sources
 
 Garnier, Edith L'Alliance Impie Editions du Felin, 2008, Paris  Interview

Ambassadors of France to the Ottoman Empire
1537 deaths
Year of birth unknown
16th-century French diplomats
16th-century French people
1536 in the Ottoman Empire